Forbush can refer to:

Fictional characters
 Forbush Man, a character in the comic book Not Brand Echh 
 Nellie Forbush, a character in the musical South Pacific

People
 Scott Forbush (1904–1984), astronomer
 Edward Howe Forbush, ornithologist and author of Birds of New England

Places
 Forbush, Iowa, an unincorporated community
 Forbush Township, Yadkin County, North Carolina, USA
 Forbush, North Carolina, a community within Forbush Township
 Forbush Lake on Vancouver Island

Other
 Forbush decrease, in astronomy, a decrease in observed cosmic ray intensity